is a railway station in the city of Nikkō, Tochigi, Japan, operated by the East Japan Railway Company (JR East).

Lines
Imaichi Station is served by the Nikkō Line, and is located 33.9 kilometers from the starting point of the line at

Station layout
The station consists of an island platform serving two tracks, connected to the station building by a footbridge. the station is staffed.

Platforms

History
Imaichi Station opened on 1 June 1890. On 1 April 1987, the station came under the control of JR East with the privatization of the Japanese National Railways (JNR). A new station building was completed in 2013.

Passenger statistics
In fiscal 2019, the station was used by an average of 1170 passengers daily (boarding passengers only).

Surrounding area
 Former Imaichi city hall 
 Imaichi Post Office

See also
 List of railway stations in Japan

References

External links
 
 JR East Station information 

Railway stations in Tochigi Prefecture
Nikkō Line
Stations of East Japan Railway Company
Railway stations in Japan opened in 1890
Nikkō, Tochigi